Ill at Ease is the third full-length studio album by the Australian alternative metal band The Mark of Cain. It was released in 1995 by Australian label rooArt and produced by Henry Rollins. "First Time" and "LMA" were released as singles from the album. "The Contender", "Interloper", "You Let Me Down", "Hindsight" and "Pointman" were remixed for release on the following album Rock and Roll.

Track listing
 "Interloper" – 4:40
 "Hindsight" – 5:12
 "First Time" – 4:05
 "Remember Me" – 3:53
 "Point Man" – 7:20
 "Walk Away" – 4:53
 "You Let Me Down" – 5:33
 "Tell Me" – 4:18
 "Contender" – 6:01
 "LMA" – 5:24

Personnel
John Scott – guitar, vocals
Kim Scott – bass guitar
Aaron Hewson – drums

Charts

References

1995 albums
The Mark of Cain (band) albums